Duployan is a Unicode block containing characters for various Duployan shorthands, including French Duployéan, Chinook Writing, Romanian shorthand, and the English Sloan-Duployan, Pernin, and Perrault shorthands. It is the first block of shorthand characters included in the Unicode Standard.

Block

History
The following Unicode-related documents record the purpose and process of defining specific characters in the Duployan block:

See also 
 Shorthand Format Controls

References 

Unicode blocks